The 1992–93 Philadelphia Flyers season was the team's 26th season in the National Hockey League (NHL). The Flyers added Eric Lindros in a blockbuster trade, but the team failed to make the Stanley Cup playoffs for the fourth-straight season.

Off-season

In June 1992, the Flyers won the arbitration battle for 1991 first-overall pick Eric Lindros over the New York Rangers. It was determined that the Quebec Nordiques had made a deal with the Flyers before making a deal with the Rangers. In order to acquire Lindros' rights, the Flyers parted with six players, trading Steve Duchesne, Ron Hextall, Kerry Huffman, Mike Ricci, Chris Simon, the rights to Peter Forsberg, two first-round draft picks and $15 million to Quebec.

Regular season
The trio of Lindros, Mark Recchi and Brent Fedyk formed the "Crazy Eights" line in Lindros' first two years in the league, the eights being the player's jersey numbers (88, 8 and 18 respectively). Recchi set the franchise record for points in a season with 123 (53 goals, 70 assists) and Lindros scored 41 goals in 61 games. Rod Brind'Amour added 86 points (37 goals, 49 assists) of his own. Four Flyers reached the 30-goal plateau and goaltender Tommy Soderstrom finished with five shutouts: second in the NHL only to Ed Belfour of the Chicago Blackhawks. The Flyers did not name a replacement captain after Rick Tocchet was traded the previous season and instead chose to go with three alternate captains. After struggling early the Flyers made a run at the playoffs, winning their final eight regular-season games, but came four points short of the last spot.

The Flyers had the fewest power play opportunities during the regular season, with 399.

On May 24, 1993, the Flyers announced that Terry Simpson was replacing Bill Dineen as head coach.

Season standings

Schedule and results

Regular season

|- style="background:#ffc;"
| 1 || October 6 || @ Pittsburgh Penguins || 3–3 OT || 0–0–1 || 1 || 
|- style="background:#cfc;"
| 2 || October 9 || New Jersey Devils || 6–4 || 1–0–1 || 3 || 
|- style="background:#cfc;"
| 3 || October 10 || @ Washington Capitals || 4–2 || 2–0–1 || 5 || 
|- style="background:#fcf;"
| 4 || October 13 || @ Quebec Nordiques || 3–6 || 2–1–1 || 5 || 
|- style="background:#fcf;"
| 5 || October 15 || New York Islanders || 4–5 || 2–2–1 || 5 || 
|- style="background:#fcf;"
| 6 || October 17 || @ New Jersey Devils || 0–2 || 2–3–1 || 5 || 
|- style="background:#cfc;"
| 7 || October 18 || Winnipeg Jets || 5–4 || 3–3–1 || 7 || 
|- style="background:#fcf;"
| 8 || October 20 || @ New York Islanders || 3–4 || 3–4–1 || 7 || 
|- style="background:#ffc;"
| 9 || October 22 || Vancouver Canucks || 4–4 OT || 3–4–2 || 8 || 
|- style="background:#fcf;"
| 10 || October 24 || Montreal Canadiens || 6–7 || 3–5–2 || 8 || 
|- style="background:#fcf;"
| 11 || October 26 || @ New York Rangers || 4–8 || 3–6–2 || 8 || 
|- style="background:#ffc;"
| 12 || October 29 || @ Chicago Blackhawks || 5–5 OT || 3–6–3 || 9 || 
|- style="background:#fcf;"
| 13 || October 31 || @ St. Louis Blues || 4–6 || 3–7–3 || 9 || 
|-

|- style="background:#fcf;"
| 14 || November 4 || @ New York Rangers || 1–3 || 3–8–3 || 9 || 
|- style="background:#cfc;"
| 15 || November 7 || St. Louis Blues || 4–2 || 4–8–3 || 11 || 
|- style="background:#cfc;"
| 16 || November 12 || New York Islanders || 8–5 || 5–8–3 || 13 || 
|- style="background:#cfc;"
| 17 || November 14 || @ Montreal Canadiens || 4–3 OT || 6–8–3 || 15 || 
|- style="background:#cfc;"
| 18 || November 15 || Ottawa Senators || 7–2 || 7–8–3 || 17 || 
|- style="background:#cfc;"
| 19 || November 19 || New York Rangers || 7–3 || 8–8–3 || 19 || 
|- style="background:#fcf;"
| 20 || November 21 || @ Boston Bruins || 3–4 || 8–9–3 || 19 || 
|- style="background:#ffc;"
| 21 || November 22 || Buffalo Sabres || 4–4 OT || 8–9–4 || 20 || 
|- style="background:#cfc;"
| 22 || November 27 || New York Islanders || 6–3 || 9–9–4 || 22 || 
|- style="background:#fcf;"
| 23 || November 28 || @ New York Islanders || 3–9 || 9–10–4 || 22 || 
|-

|- style="background:#cfc;"
| 24 || December 3 || Quebec Nordiques || 3–2 OT || 10–10–4 || 24 || 
|- style="background:#fcf;"
| 25 || December 5 || @ Ottawa Senators || 2–3 || 10–11–4 || 24 || 
|- style="background:#fcf;"
| 26 || December 6 || Boston Bruins || 1–7 || 10–12–4 || 24 || 
|- style="background:#fcf;"
| 27 || December 11 || @ Detroit Red Wings || 2–4 || 10–13–4 || 24 || 
|- style="background:#fcf;"
| 28 || December 12 || Washington Capitals || 2–5 || 10–14–4 || 24 || 
|- style="background:#fcf;"
| 29 || December 15 || @ Pittsburgh Penguins || 2–6 || 10–15–4 || 24 || 
|- style="background:#fcf;"
| 30 || December 17 || Pittsburgh Penguins || 4–5 OT || 10–16–4 || 24 || 
|- style="background:#cfc;"
| 31 || December 19 || Chicago Blackhawks || 3–1 || 11–16–4 || 26 || 
|- style="background:#fcf;"
| 32 || December 20 || @ Tampa Bay Lightning || 1–4 || 11–17–4 || 26 || 
|- style="background:#fcf;"
| 33 || December 23 || Pittsburgh Penguins || 0–4 || 11–18–4 || 26 || 
|- style="background:#ffc;"
| 34 || December 26 || @ Washington Capitals || 5–5 OT || 11–18–5 || 27 || 
|- style="background:#cfc;"
| 35 || December 29 || @ Los Angeles Kings || 10–2 || 12–18–5 || 29 || 
|- style="background:#cfc;"
| 36 || December 30 || @ San Jose Sharks || 6–2 || 13–18–5 || 31 || 
|-

|- style="background:#fcf;"
| 37 || January 2 || @ Calgary Flames || 3–7 || 13–19–5 || 31 || 
|- style="background:#ffc;"
| 38 || January 3 || @ Edmonton Oilers || 2–2 OT || 13–19–6 || 32 || 
|- style="background:#cfc;"
| 39 || January 7 || Washington Capitals || 8–2 || 14–19–6 || 34 || 
|- style="background:#cfc;"
| 40 || January 9 || New York Rangers || 4–3 || 15–19–6 || 36 || 
|- style="background:#cfc;"
| 41 || January 10 || Edmonton Oilers || 4–0 || 16–19–6 || 38 || 
|- style="background:#ffc;"
| 42 || January 14 || Calgary Flames || 4–4 OT || 16–19–7 || 39 || 
|- style="background:#cfc;"
| 43 || January 16 || @ Boston Bruins || 5–4 || 17–19–7 || 41 || 
|- style="background:#fcf;"
| 44 || January 17 || Detroit Red Wings || 4–7 || 17–20–7 || 41 || 
|- style="background:#fcf;"
| 45 || January 21 || Boston Bruins || 4–5 || 17–21–7 || 41 || 
|- style="background:#fcf;"
| 46 || January 23 || @ New York Islanders || 4–8 || 17–22–7 || 41 || 
|- style="background:#cfc;"
| 47 || January 24 || Hartford Whalers || 5–4 OT || 18–22–7 || 43 || 
|- style="background:#fcf;"
| 48 || January 26 || Buffalo Sabres || 3–4 OT || 18–23–7 || 43 || 
|- style="background:#fcf;"
| 49 || January 28 || Quebec Nordiques || 3–6 || 18–24–7 || 43 || 
|- style="background:#fcf;"
| 50 || January 30 || @ Pittsburgh Penguins || 2–4 || 18–25–7 || 43 || 
|- style="background:#fcf;"
| 51 || January 31 || @ Montreal Canadiens || 4–6 || 18–26–7 || 43 || 
|-

|- style="background:#ffc;"
| 52 || February 3 || @ New York Rangers || 2–2 OT || 18–26–8 || 44 || 
|- style="background:#cfc;"
| 53 || February 9 || Ottawa Senators || 8–1 || 19–26–8 || 46 || 
|- style="background:#ffc;"
| 54 || February 11 || Montreal Canadiens || 0–0 OT || 19–26–9 || 47 || 
|- style="background:#fcf;"
| 55 || February 13 || @ New Jersey Devils || 4–6 || 19–27–9 || 47 || 
|- style="background:#fcf;"
| 56 || February 14 || New Jersey Devils || 2–5 || 19–28–9 || 47 || 
|- style="background:#ffc;"
| 57 || February 16 || @ Calgary Flames || 4–4 OT || 19–28–10 || 48 || 
|- style="background:#cfc;"
| 58 || February 18 || @ Vancouver Canucks || 3–2 || 20–28–10 || 50 || 
|- style="background:#fcf;"
| 59 || February 20 || @ Minnesota North Stars || 2–5 || 20–29–10 || 50 || 
|- style="background:#ffc;"
| 60 || February 22 || Detroit Red Wings || 5–5 OT || 20–29–11 || 51 || 
|- style="background:#cfc;"
| 61 || February 24 || @ Hartford Whalers || 5–2 || 21–29–11 || 53 || 
|- style="background:#cfc;"
| 62 || February 25 || New Jersey Devils || 6–2 || 22–29–11 || 55 || 
|- style="background:#fcf;"
| 63 || February 27 || New York Islanders || 2–3 || 22–30–11 || 55 || 
|-
| colspan="7" style="text-align:center;"|
Notes:
 Neutral site game played at the Riverfront Coliseum in Cincinnati, Ohio.  Neutral site game played at the Richfield Coliseum in Richfield Township, Ohio.
|-

|- style="background:#cfc;"
| 64 || March 2 || Pittsburgh Penguins || 5–4 || 23–30–11 || 57 || 
|- style="background:#cfc;"
| 65 || March 5 || @ Washington Capitals || 3–0 || 24–30–11 || 59 || 
|- style="background:#fcf;"
| 66 || March 7 || @ New Jersey Devils || 3–7 || 24–31–11 || 59 || 
|- style="background:#fcf;"
| 67 || March 9 || @ New York Islanders || 2–4 || 24–32–11 || 59 || 
|- style="background:#cfc;"
| 68 || March 11 || Washington Capitals || 6–4 || 25–32–11 || 61 || 
|- style="background:#cfc;"
| 69 || March 16 || Minnesota North Stars || 4–3 || 26–32–11 || 63 || 
|- style="background:#fcf;"
| 70 || March 20 || @ Pittsburgh Penguins || 3–9 || 26–33–11 || 63 || 
|- style="background:#fcf;"
| 71 || March 21 || New Jersey Devils || 2–3 || 26–34–11 || 63 || 
|- style="background:#cfc;"
| 72 || March 24 || @ New York Rangers || 5–4 || 27–34–11 || 65 || 
|- style="background:#cfc;"
| 73 || March 25 || San Jose Sharks || 5–2 || 28–34–11 || 67 || 
|- style="background:#fcf;"
| 74 || March 27 || @ Quebec Nordiques || 3–8 || 28–35–11 || 67 || 
|- style="background:#fcf;"
| 75 || March 30 || @ New York Islanders || 1–2 || 28–36–11 || 67 || 
|-

|- style="background:#fcf;"
| 76 || April 1 || Los Angeles Kings || 1–3 || 28–37–11 || 67 || 
|- style="background:#cfc;"
| 77 || April 3 || Tampa Bay Lightning || 6–2 || 29–37–11 || 69 || 
|- style="background:#cfc;"
| 78 || April 4 || Toronto Maple Leafs || 4–0 || 30–37–11 || 71 || 
|- style="background:#cfc;"
| 79 || April 6 || @ Winnipeg Jets || 4–2 || 31–37–11 || 73 || 
|- style="background:#cfc;"
| 80 || April 8 || Washington Capitals || 4–3 || 32–37–11 || 75 || 
|- style="background:#cfc;"
| 81 || April 10 || @ Toronto Maple Leafs || 4–0 || 33–37–11 || 77 || 
|- style="background:#cfc;"
| 82 || April 12 || New York Rangers || 1–0 || 34–37–11 || 79 || 
|- style="background:#cfc;"
| 83 || April 15 || @ Buffalo Sabres || 7–4 || 35–37–11 || 81 || 
|- style="background:#cfc;"
| 84 || April 16 || @ Hartford Whalers || 5–4 OT || 36–37–11 || 83 || 
|-

|-
| Legend:

Player statistics

Scoring
 Position abbreviations: C = Center; D = Defense; G = Goaltender; LW = Left Wing; RW = Right Wing
  = Joined team via a transaction (e.g., trade, waivers, signing) during the season. Stats reflect time with the Flyers only.
  = Left team via a transaction (e.g., trade, waivers, release) during the season. Stats reflect time with the Flyers only.

Goaltending

Awards and records

Awards

Records

Among the team records set during the 1992–93 season was Eric Lindros scoring the fastest goal from the start of a period (five seconds) in team history on November 12. On April 15, Kevin Dineen tied team records for most shorthanded goals scored during a game (2) and most points in a single period (4). On the season, Mark Recchi registered a team record 123 points in his first full season with the Flyers, surpassing Bobby Clarke’s 119 points in 1975–76. Lindros set a team rookie record with 41 goals scored. The 319 goals against by the Flyers during the season is a franchise high.

Transactions
The Flyers were involved in the following transactions from June 2, 1992, the day after the deciding game of the 1992 Stanley Cup Finals, through June 9, 1993, the day of the deciding game of the 1993 Stanley Cup Finals.

Trades

Players acquired

Players lost

Signings

Draft picks

NHL Entry Draft
Philadelphia's picks at the 1992 NHL Entry Draft, which was held at the Montreal Forum in Montreal, Quebec, on June 20, 1992. The Flyers traded their third-round pick, 55th overall, Brian Dobbin, Gord Murphy, and their 1993 fourth-round pick to the Boston Bruins for Garry Galley, Wes Walz and the Bruins' 1993 third-round pick on January 2, 1992. They also traded their fourth-round pick, 79th overall, and Murray Craven to the Hartford Whalers for Kevin Dineen on November 13, 1991.

NHL Supplemental Draft
Philadelphia's picks at the 1992 NHL Supplemental Draft on June 19, 1992.

Farm teams
The Flyers were affiliated with the Hershey Bears of the American Hockey League. Led by Tim Tookey's 108-point season, Hershey finished 5th in their division and missed the playoffs.

Notes

References
General
 
 
 
Specific

1992–93 NHL season by team
1992–93 in American ice hockey by team
1992
Philadelphia
Philadelphia